Iris marsica is a plant species in the genus Iris, it is also in the subgenus Iris. It is a rhizomatous perennial, from the Apennine Mountains, in Italy. It has glaucous, sickle-shaped or curved, light green leaves, slender stem with 2 branches, and 3 violet, light blue violet, dark violet, and dark purple flowers. It was only found and described since 1973, and is not yet in general cultivation. It was once thought to be a form of Iris germanica, but has different morphological characteristics and different chromosomal differences.

Description
It is similar in form to Iris germanica, but it has more curved leaves (or sickle-shaped,) greener, and longer leaves, the stem is less glaucous, and it has less scarious (membranous) spathes.

It has a thick rhizome, with many stoloniferous and fibrous branches. The rhizomes grow at ground level.

It has herbaceous, (or deciduous), falcate (sickle-shaped), light green and slightly glaucous leaves. They often have 2–3 basal (rising from the rhizome) leaves, with one sheathing the stem.

It has 2 short branches, (or pedicels), the lowest branch is similar in length to the bract. The other branch, appears from the midpoint on the stem.

The stem has 2–3 green, marked with purple, slightly inflated, rounded, spathes (leaves of the flower bud). They are scarious (along the top part of the leaf), at blooming time.

The stem (and the branches) hold up to 3 flowers, in early season, in April, May, or between May and June.

The slightly fragrant, flowers come in shades of violet, light blue violet, dark violet, and dark purple. It sometimes has bi-toned flowers.

Like other irises, it has 2 pairs of petals, 3 large sepals (outer petals), known as the 'falls' and 3 inner, smaller petals (or tepals), known as the 'standards'.
They have dark veining on the haft (near to the stem), They also sometimes curl under. In the centre, of the falls is a 'beard', or line of white hairs, tipped with yellow.

It has 3.8 cm long perianth tube, the style branch is normally, white with violet crest. The crest is toothed (dentate). It has white or blue filaments, and pale cream pollen. It has a triangular in section ovary.

After the iris has flowered, it produces a seed capsule, which has not been described.

Biochemistry
In 2000, 11 iris species were studied and their leaf flavonoid, isoflavonoid and xanthone (chemical) constituents were analysed in order to investigate their phylogeny. Iris marsica is thought to have originated from Iris pseudopumila Tineo (chromosomal count of 2n= 16) x Iris variegata L. (2n = 24) but other possible parents are Iris pallida Lam., Iris cengialti Kern. (Terpin et al. 1996),Iris illyrica Tomm. (2n = 24) and Iris reichenbachii Heuff. (2n = 24).

As most irises are diploid, having two sets of chromosomes, this can be used to identify hybrids and classification of groupings.
It has a chromosome count: 2n=40, it was counted by Colasante & Sauer in 1993.
The chromosomal count of 2n=40 is the same as Iris setina, Iris bicapitata, Iris lutescens, Iris relicta and Iris revoluta.

Taxonomy
It has the common name of 'Marsican iris'. 

The Latin specific epithet marsica refers to Monti Marsicani (a mountain range) in Abruzzo, Italy.

It was first published and described by Ignazio Ricci (1922–1986) and Maria Antonietta Colasante in 'Annali di botanica' Vol.32 page218, in 1973 (published in 1974), published in Rome, with 14 colour illustrations.

It was later published in the 'Bulletin of the American Iris Society' Vol.292 on pages 82–85 in January 1994.

It was verified by United States Department of Agriculture and the Agricultural Research Service on 4 April 2003, then updated on 3 December 2004.

It is listed in the Encyclopedia of Life.

Iris marsica is an accepted name by the RHS.

Distribution and habitat
It is native to South-eastern Europe.

Range
It is endemic to Italy, within the regions of Umbria, Marche, Lazio, Molise and Abruzzo.

The Abruzzo National Park.

It is listed in a checklist of Vascular Flora in Italy, with Iris albicans, Iris bicapitata, Iris foetidissima, Iris germanica, Iris marsica, Iris pallida, Iris planifolia, Iris pseudacorus, Iris pseudopumila, Iris relicta, Iris revoluta Iris setina, Iris sibirica and Iris xiphium.

It is also listed as endemic species of the Apennines with Aquilegia magellensis, Centaurea scannensis, Jonopsidium savianum, Goniolimon italicum, Astragalus aquilanus and Achillea luncana.

Habitat
It grows on the dry grasslands, mountain pastures, and scrub lands.

Conservation
Iris marsica has only been recorded from a limited number of locations, about 12 localities have a stable population. Most (10), are within the Abruzzo National Park.

It is at risk of extinction, due to the threat of collection (from the wild).

It is listed on the IUCN Red List of Plants of Italy, on both the national and regional sections, as 'lower risk (LR).

It is now listed as a 'strictly protected' flora species. It is protected by the EU Habitats Directive (Annex IV) and the Berne Convention (Annexe I) 1979.

3 records are listed on Global Biodiversity Information Facility.

In 2011, it was listed on the European Red List of Vascular Plants of the IUCN as 'Data Deficient' (DD).

Cultivation
It is hardy.

It prefers situations in well-drained soils in full sun.

It can be grown on slopes, and can be grown in similar situations as other bearded irises.

It is not regularly available for sale, but only cultivated by iris collectors.

Specimens can be seen in 'Michele Tenore Majella Botanical Garden', (also known as 'Giardino Botanico della Majella') situated within the
scree slopes section of the garden.

Propagation
Irises can generally be propagated by division, or by seed growing.

Toxicity
Like many other irises, most parts of the plant are poisonous (rhizome and leaves), and if mistakenly ingested can cause stomach pains and vomiting. Handling the plant may cause skin irritation or an allergic reaction.

References

Sources
 Mathew, B. 1981. The Iris. 31.
 Tutin, T. G. et al., eds. 1964–1980. Flora europaea.

External links
 Has an image of the iris in flower
 Has a map of Italy, where the flower can be located and several images of the flowers

marsica
Plants described in 1973
Garden plants
Flora of Europe
Flora of Italy
Endemic flora of Italy